PR:NS may refer to:

 Power Rangers Ninja Storm
 Power Rangers Ninja Steel